The Fox Club is a private all-male final club of Harvard undergraduate students founded in 1898. The Fox Club is not officially affiliated with Harvard University. It is located on John F. Kennedy Street in Harvard Square.

History
The Fox Club was founded in 1898 by six undergraduate students. Originally known as the Digamma Club, the name Fox and the club's symbol, a fox carrying the letter "F", grew from the similarity between the letter "F" and the archaic Greek character for "digamma", which primarily signifies the number 6. The clubhouse has three floors that serve both the undergraduate and alumni membership, as well as an underground level where club members may invite guests. The clubhouse was built in 1906 and designed by Guy Lowell, a prominent American architect who also designed the Museum of Fine Arts in Boston and the New York State Supreme Court Building. The building is located on 44 John F. Kennedy Street in Cambridge, Massachusetts, and is a city historic landmark or otherwise protected property.

All-male status
Harvard attempted to impose sanctions against members of single-gender final clubs, preventing those people from holding student group leadership positions, serving as varsity athletic team captains, and from having fellowships endorsed by the college. However, after acknowledging that this policy against final clubs violated federal law, Harvard rescinded all sanctions in 2019.

In 2015, the Fox Club was one of the first of Harvard's final clubs to admit women, but only on a provisional basis by the club's undergraduate board. In an August 2015 vote by the club's undergraduate members, nine women were given provisional membership. This vote was reportedly taken without input from the club's graduate members. After the women were admitted, a rift developed between undergraduate members and alum members, leading the graduate board to lock undergraduates out of the club's house through the second half of the fall semester. The nine women's provisional member status expired upon their graduation in June 2017. By July 2017 the club had reverted to an all-male membership.

On September 7, 2018, the club was included in a public list of Harvard social organizations that had pledged to become gender-inclusive and thereby had been recognized by the college, exempting them from Harvard's sanctions. Two weeks later, however, the club was removed from Harvard's online list of recognized social organizations as Harvard was unable to provide consistent guidelines for remaining a recognized social organization. At this time, the club would again be subject to the College's sanctions policy.

In May 2019, The Harvard Crimson reported that a vote of all Fox Club graduate members had failed to reach the two-thirds affirmative majority necessary to change membership policies and allow women to join. This decision came in spite of two successive undergraduate votes which strongly favored admitting members regardless of gender. To date, the club remains all-male and is no longer subject to sanctions after Harvard rescinded its policy acknowledging that it violated federal law.

Notable members 
 T.S. Eliot, British essayist, publisher, playwright, literary and social critic
 Van Wyck Brooks, Pulitzer Prize-winning historian, literary critic, and biographer
 Hermann Hagedorn, American author, poet, and biographer
 King Birendra Bir Bikram Shah Dev, King of Nepal from 1972 to 2001
 Henry Cabot Lodge, Jr., U.S. senator from Massachusetts and U.S. ambassador to the United Nations, South Vietnam, West Germany, and the Holy See
 John Davis Lodge, former actor and politician, congressman, 79th governor of Connecticut, and U.S. ambassador to Spain, Argentina, and Switzerland
 Bill Gates, co-founder of Microsoft and co-chair of the Bill & Melinda Gates Foundation
 Steve Ballmer, former chief executive officer of Microsoft
 Paul Wylie, figure skater
 Maxwell Perkins, literary editor and publisher who gave writers Ernest Hemingway and F. Scott Fitzgerald their start. Hemingway dedicated The Old Man and the Sea to Perkins.
 Peter J. Gomes, American preacher and theologian, Plummer Professor of Christian Morals at Harvard Divinity School and Pusey Minister at Harvard's Memorial Church
 David Herbert Donald, American historian
 Paul A. Freund, American jurist and law professor
 Robert G. Albion, Harvard's first professor of oceanic history
 Fernando Zóbel de Ayala y Montojo, Spanish Filipino painter and businessman
 Jaime Zobel de Ayala, Filipino businessman, philanthropist, Philippine Ambassador to The Court of St. James's, and art photographer; chairman emeritus of Ayala Corporation
 J. Sinclair Armstrong, Former Chairman of The U.S. Securities and Exchange Commission
 William R. Driver, Jr., Former Partner, Brown Brothers Harriman & Co.
 Lamar Fleming, Jr., Former Chairman and CEO, Anderson, Clayton and Company
 C. Kevin Landry, Former Managing Partner and CEO, TA Associates, Private Equity Hall of Fame
 Royal Little, Founder and Former Chairman and CEO, Textron Inc.
 Colman M. Mockler, Jr., Former Chairman and CEO, The Gillette Company
 Sinclair Weeks, Former U.S. Senator from Massachusetts, 13th U.S. Secretary of Commerce

References
Notes

Bibliography
 "Fox Club Undergraduate Association, Inc., Summary Screen", The Commonwealth Of Massachusetts, William Francis Galvin, Secretary Of The Commonwealth, Corporations Division

External links

Harvard University
Collegiate secret societies
Clubs and societies in the United States
Student societies in the United States
1898 establishments in Massachusetts
Student organizations established in 1898